Jonah Frankel, also spelled Yonah Frankel, Jonah Fraenkel (1928–2012) was an author,  Hebrew literature professor and Israel Prize laureate.

Biography
Jonah Frankel was born in Munich in 1928 and emigrated to Israel in 1937 when the Nazis came to power.  He was a Professor Emeritus of Aggadah and Midrash in the Department of Hebrew Literature at the Hebrew University of Jerusalem.  
He has been described as "One of the most important scholars of the modern study of midrash"

Published works
Darkhei Ha-Aggadah VeHa-Midrash (The Ways of the Midrash and the Aggadah), a two volume set, is an encyclopedic guide to the study of Midrash and Aggadah in broader Jewish culture. 
 Time and its role in the aggadic story (Jewish civilization university series)

Awards and honors
 In 1993, Jonah Frankel received the Bialik Prize for significant accomplishments in Hebrew literature.
 In 2000, Jonah Frankel won the Israel Prize in Talmudic research, for his work on interpreting midrash and aggada.

References

External links 
Jonah Frankel Biography in Hebrew

Jewish German writers
Israel Prize in literature recipients
1928 births
2012 deaths
Talmudists
Jewish philosophers
Israeli philosophers
Jewish emigrants from Nazi Germany to Mandatory Palestine
Israel Prize in Talmud studies recipients
Academic staff of the Hebrew University of Jerusalem
Hebrew University of Jerusalem alumni
Jewish Israeli writers